Sutterella wadsworthensis is a gram-negative bacterium from the genus Sutterella in the family Sutterellaceae.

References

External links
Type strain of Sutterella wadsworthensis at BacDive -  the Bacterial Diversity Metadatabase

Burkholderiales
Bacteria described in 1996